Executive Order 13397, signed by President George W. Bush on March 7, 2006, concerns the "Responsibilities of the Department of Homeland Security with Respect to Faith-Based and Community Initiatives". The executive order directs the Department of Homeland Security to "coordinate a national effort to expand opportunities for faith-based and other community organizations and to strengthen their capacity to better meet America's social and community needs."

External links

 Executive Order 13397: Responsibilities of the Department of Homeland Security with Respect to Faith-Based and Community Initiatives, March 7, 2006, the White House Archives
 Department of Homeland Security: Press Release: Executive Order: 13397 (March 8, 2006)

13397